These are lists of Scooby-Doo episodes:

 List of Scooby-Doo, Where Are You! episodes
 List of The New Scooby-Doo Movies episodes
 List of The Scooby-Doo Show episodes
 List of A Pup Named Scooby-Doo episodes
 List of What's New, Scooby-Doo? episodes
 List of Shaggy & Scooby-Doo Get a Clue! episodes
 List of Scooby-Doo! Mystery Incorporated episodes
 List of Be Cool, Scooby-Doo! episodes
 List of Scooby-Doo and Guess Who? episodes